Wenner is a surname. Notable people with the surname include:

Axel Wenner-Gren (1881–1961), Swedish industrial magnate
Christopher Wenner (1954–2021), British journalist 
François Wenner (1889–1964), Lusambo provincial governor, Belgian Congo (1940–1944)
Jann Wenner (born 1946), creator of Rolling Stone magazine
Kurt Wenner, street artist 
Max Wenner (1887–1937), known for mysterious death
Rosemarie Wenner (born 1955), Methodist bishop in Germany
Violet B. Wenner (1884–1970), portrait painter

See also 
Corliss v. Wenner, 34 P.3d 1100 (Idaho 2001), case decided by the Court of Appeals of Idaho
Wenner-Gren Center, tower and building complex in Vasastaden, Stockholm
Louise Wener, English musician and writer